The 2018 season for the BMC Racing Team began in January with the Tour Down Under. As a UCI WorldTeam, they were automatically invited and obligated to send a squad to every event in the UCI World Tour.

Team roster

Riders who joined the team for the 2018 season

Riders who left the team during or after the 2017 season

Season victories

National, Continental and World champions 2018

Footnotes

References

External links
 

2018 road cycling season by team
CCC Pro Team
2018 in American sports